The Town of Crooked Ways is a 1920 British silent drama film directed by Bert Wynne and starring Edward O'Neill, Poppy Wyndham and Denis Cowles. It was based on a novel by J.S. Fletcher.

Cast
 Edward O'Neill as Solomon Quamperdene 
 Poppy Wyndham as Queenie Clay 
 Denis Cowles as Bevis Coleman 
 Cyril Percival as Clarence Quamperdene 
 Eileen Magrath as Millie Earnshaw 
 George Bellamy as James Winter 
 Joan Ferry as Beatrice Quamperdene 
 Bert Wynne as Winterton Loring 
 Charles Vane as Alderman Tanqueray 
 Arthur M. Cullin as Parson 
 Arthur Walcott as Jack Ricketts 
 Judd Green as Chancellor Slee 
 Lyell Johnstone as Ben Claybourne 
 Ida Fane as Miss Grampayne 
 Wallace Bosco as Mallowes 
 Fred Rains as Chyver

References

External links
 

1920 films
Films directed by Bert Wynne
1920 drama films
British drama films
British silent feature films
British black-and-white films
1920s English-language films
1920s British films
Silent drama films